The Hamilton Convention Centre is a full service convention, exhibition, and event facility located in downtown Hamilton, Ontario, Canada. The convention centre was designed by local architect Trevor P. Garwood-Jones and was constructed in 1981 along with the connected Ellen Fairclough Building as part of a large urban renewal project that was occurring in the Hamilton downtown core at the time.

In 2013, Carmen's Group acquired the rights to operate the Hamilton Convention Centre, and the facility underwent over $1 million in renovations.

Description

Level 1
The first floor of the Hamilton Convention Centre features the Wentworth Room, a  exhibition space with removable divider walls allowing for 3 separate exhibition spaces, each with their own entrance. The Wentworth Concourse runs the entire length of the Wentworth room, and features a direct connection to FirstOntario Concert Hall. The Hamilton Convention Centre Décor Gallery is also located on this level. The Convention Centre's loading dock is located on this level, and features a drive-through door and a ramp leading to the Wentworth Room, as well as a large freight elevator capable of transporting vehicles to the second and third levels. The loading dock is shared with the Ellen Fairclough Building and FirstOntario Concert Hall The Ellen Fairclough Building has a separate lobby located along King Street West.

Level 2
The second floor of the Hamilton Convention Centre features the Albion Room, a  ballroom with removable divider walls allowing for 3 separate rooms, each with their own entrance. The second floor also features 8 meeting rooms, one of which overlooks the Wentworth Room via a window. This floor also features a large outdoor public plaza and sculpture court known as Commonwealth Square, which is located above Summers Lane, and is shared with the Art Gallery of Hamilton and FirstOntario Concert Hall. Connections with the Sheraton Hamilton Hotel and the Lloyd D. Jackson Square mall are on this level, being accessible via an enclosed pedestrian bridge.

Level 3
The third floor of the Hamilton Convention Centre features the Chedoke and Webster Rooms. With the use of removable divider walls, the Chedoke Ballroom can be divided into a total of 5 separate rooms. However, the maximum configuration allowing for individual entrances to the Chedoke Ballrooms is 3 separate rooms. The Webster room can also be divided into 3 separate rooms with individual entrances. The Webster Lounge features a private bar that overlooks the intersection of King Street and MacNab Street. The third floor also features an outdoor patio known as the Webster Terrace, as well as a large meeting room. All floors above this level are considered part of the Ellen Fairclough Building, and are used to house various government offices.

See also
Ellen Fairclough Building
FirstOntario Concert Hall
Art Gallery of Hamilton
FirstOntario Centre
Sheraton Hamilton
Lloyd D. Jackson Square
List of tallest buildings in Hamilton, Ontario

References

Buildings and structures in Hamilton, Ontario
Government buildings completed in 1981
Convention centres in Canada
Culture of Hamilton, Ontario
Tourist attractions in Hamilton, Ontario
1981 establishments in Ontario